The 1957 NBA All Star Game was the seventh NBA All-Star Game.  With the score 43-39 in favor of the West and with time running out in the first half, the East's Bill Sharman attempted to throw a long pass to Bob Cousy.  Instead, the play resulted in him making a remarkable  shot to end the first half.

Roster

Eastern Conference
Head Coach: Red Auerbach, Boston Celtics

Western Conference
Head Coach: Bobby Wanzer, Rochester Royals

References 

National Basketball Association All-Star Game
All-Star Game
NBA All-Star Game
Basketball competitions in Boston
1950s in Boston
January 1957 sports events in the United States